Stenanthemum nanum is a species of flowering plant in the family Rhamnaceae and is endemic to the south-west of Western Australia. It is a prostrate shrub with hairy young stems, broadly egg-shaped leaves with the narrower end towards the base, and densely silvery-hairy heads of white or cream-coloured flowers.

Description
There are two teeth on eith side of the end of the leaf and the lower surface is densely covered with straight and star-shaped hairs.

Taxonomy and naming
The specific epithet (nanum) means "dwarf", referring to the size of the plant.

Distribution and habitat
This species grows in woodland and forest from east of Armadale to near Boddingtonin the Jarrah Forest bioregion of south-western Western Australia.

Conservation status
Stenanthemum nanum is listed as "not threatened" by the Government of Western Australia Department of Biodiversity, Conservation and Attractions

References

nanum
Rosales of Australia
Flora of Western Australia
Plants described in 1995
Taxa named by Barbara Lynette Rye